Ivano Bertini (born April, 1968, in Milan, Italy) is an Italian astronomer at the Parthenope University of Naples.

Scientific career 

Bertini got the master's degree in astronomy at the University of Padua in 2001, discussing a thesis about the discovery, astrometry, and photometry of asteroids with the Wide Angle Camera of the OSIRIS two-camera system instrument on board the European Space Agency's Rosetta mission. He obtained the PhD title of Doctor in Space Science and Technologies at the University of Padua in 2005 with the thesis "A new model of cometary dust and the Wide Angle Camera of the Rosetta Mission". He is an associate professor at the Parthenope University of Naples, Italy. He also worked at the Physikalisches Institut of the University of Bern (Switzerland), at the Instituto de Astrofísica de Andalucía in Granada (Spain), at the European Space Astronomy Centre of the European Space Agency in Madrid (Spain), and at the Department of Physics and Astronomy of the University of Padua (Italy). He has an active role in several space missions (the imaging system OSIRIS and the dust collector instrument GIADA on board ESA Rosetta (spacecraft) to comet 67P/Churyumov–Gerasimenko, the imaging system EnVisS and dust impact monitoring instrument DISC on board ESA Comet Interceptor, ASI LICIACube as part of the NASA Double Asteroid Redirection Test mission, ESA HERA mission, ESA Solar Orbiter) and in ground-based European projects to discover and monitor hazardous Near Earth Asteroids (NEO-Shield 2 and EURONEAR).
His main research themes are: astrometry, photometry, and spectroscopy of small Solar System objects from ground and space; space instrumentation; discovery and follow-up of hazardous asteroids; dust in interplanetary space and comets. He has received the ESA recognition awards for ROSETTA. The Main Belt asteroid 95008 Ivanobertini is dedicated to him.

Asteroid 95008 Ivanobertini 

Asteroid 95008 Ivanobertini, a background asteroid in the asteroid belt, was named in his honor. The asteroid was discovered at the Italian Cima Ekar Observing Station on 4 January 2002, by the Asiago-DLR Asteroid Survey of which Ivano Bertini has been an active member. The official naming citation was published by the Minor Planet Center on 6 January 2007.

Present Lectures 

Planetology (since Academic Year 2019–2020).

Space Science and Technologies (Academic Year 2020-2021 and 2022–23).

Physics (since Academic Year 2022–23, previously General Physics from 2019 to 2020).

Publications 

For an updated complete list of publications visit the Parthenope University of Naples Teacher's page:
 CINECA IRIS Institutional Research Information System. Parthenope University of Naples: Prof. Ivano Bertini

Latest Book 

Fundamentals of Astronomy - Second Edition. CRC Press - Taylor & Francis Group. 2020.

References

External links 
 JPL Small-Body Database Browser on 95008 Ivanobertini
 The Asiago-DLR Asteroid-Survey 
 OSIRIS - The Scientific Imaging System for Rosetta
 ESA Rosetta Mission
 Book 'Asteroids. Prospective Energy and Material Resources'. Viorel Badescu Editor. Springer (2013)

1968 births
University of Padua alumni
Living people
21st-century Italian astronomers